In mathematics, a syndetic set is a subset of the natural numbers having the property of "bounded gaps": that the sizes of the gaps in the sequence of natural numbers is bounded.

Definition
A set  is called syndetic if for some finite subset  of 

where . Thus syndetic sets have "bounded gaps"; for a syndetic set , there is an integer  such that  for any .

See also
 Ergodic Ramsey theory
 Piecewise syndetic set 
 Thick set

References 
 
 
 

Semigroup theory
Ergodic theory